The 2000–01 Botola is the 45th season of the Moroccan Premier League. Raja Casablanca are the holders of the title.

References

Morocco 2000–01

Botola seasons
Morocco
Botola